Isaac Muleme (born 10 October 1992) is a Ugandan professional footballer who plays as a left-back for Viktoria Žižkov.

Club career
In February 2019 Isaac joined Czech side Viktoria Žižkov from Egyptian club Haras El Hodoud.

In February 2020, Muleme joined Fortuna Liga side FC Nitra on a half-season loan. He made his league debut during first possible opportunity, in a home fixture at pod Zoborom, on 15 February 2020 against Pohronie. Pohronie and Nitra were in a direct battle to avoid direct relegation spots, with Nitra just a point ahead of Žiar nad Hronom-based novices. Muleme debuted in the 81st minute, when he entered as a substitute for Duje Javorčić. The match concluded in a goal-less tie.

International career
In January 2014, coach Milutin Sredojević, invited him to be included in the Uganda national team for the 2014 African Nations Championship. The team placed third in the group stage of the competition after beating Burkina Faso, drawing with Zimbabwe and losing to Morocco.

Career statistics

International

References

External links
 

1992 births
Living people
Sportspeople from Kampala
Ugandan footballers
Association football fullbacks
Uganda international footballers
Uganda A' international footballers
2014 African Nations Championship players
2019 Africa Cup of Nations players
2016 African Nations Championship players
2018 African Nations Championship players
Egyptian Premier League players
Czech National Football League players
Slovak Super Liga players
SC Villa players
SC Victoria University players
Kampala Capital City Authority FC players
Haras El Hodoud SC players
FK Viktoria Žižkov players
FC Nitra players
Ugandan expatriate footballers
Ugandan expatriate sportspeople in Egypt
Expatriate footballers in Egypt
Ugandan expatriate sportspeople in the Czech Republic
Expatriate footballers in the Czech Republic
Ugandan expatriate sportspeople in Slovakia
Expatriate footballers in Slovakia
Bohemian Football League players